The Absence is the second studio album by the American metal band Luna Mortis. The album was released in 2009 by Century Media and is the first studio album that Luna Mortis released through that record label. Four of the tracks on the album were recorded in February 2008 with producer Jason Suecof at his Audio Hammer Studios and were used as a demo that was sent out only to record labels in hopes of acquiring a recording contract for the band. It was those four songs that led to Century Media to sign Luna Mortis and shortly after, the band returned to Audio Hammer Studios in September of that same year to record the six other songs that make up the album. In September 2009, the band released a music video for the song "Forever More".

Track listing
All songs written by Brian Koenig, except where noted.
 "Ash" - 4:41
 "Ruin" - 4:02
 "Reformation" - 3:17 
 "This Departure" - 5:10
 "The Absence" - 4:14
 "Forever More" - 3:40
 "Never Give In" (Koenig, Marry Zimmer) - 6:24
 "Phantoms" - 3:56
 "Last Defiance" - 4:27
 "Embrace the End" (Koenig, Zimmer) - 6:22

Japanese bonus tracks:
"Affliction"
 "Anemic World"

Credits
 Mary Zimmer – vocals
 Brian Koenig – guitar
 Cory Scheider – guitar
 Jacob Bare – bass guitar
 Erik Madsen – drum kit

References

2009 albums
Luna Mortis albums
Century Media Records albums
Albums produced by Jason Suecof